Castle House is situated in the Scottish town of Dunoon, Argyll and Bute. It sits on top of a promontory called Castle Hill, between West Bay and East Bay, overlooking Dunoon Pier and the Firth of Clyde. Built in 1822, it is a Category B listed structure.

The castle was built for James Ewing of Strathleven, MP and Provost of Glasgow, as his "marine villa". It was purchased by Dunoon Town Council, for £4,600, in 1893 to house the Council Chamber and Tulloch Free Library.

The flag post on Castle Hill marks the original site of a 13th-century Dunoon Castle.

Current use
The building has been home to Castle House Museum since 1998. It is run by Dunoon & Cowal Heritage Trust.

Gallery

References

External links

Castle House Museum – located in Castle House

Castles in Argyll and Bute
Category B listed buildings in Argyll and Bute
Listed castles in Scotland
Listed buildings in Dunoon
1822 establishments in Scotland